Marco Colandrea (born 6 April 1994 in Sorengo) is a Swiss Grand Prix motorcycle racer.

Career statistics

By season

Races by year
(key)

References

External links

1994 births
Living people
Swiss motorcycle racers
125cc World Championship riders
Moto2 World Championship riders
Sportspeople from Ticino